North-West Europe 1942 was a battle honour awarded to units of the British and Canadian Armies that took part in one or more of the following operations in the Second World War:
Operation Biting
St Nazaire Raid
Operation Myrmidon
Operation Abercrombie
Operation Frankton
Dieppe Raid

List of units
The following units were awarded the battle honour:

Canadian regiments

 The Toronto Scottish Regiment
 The Royal Regiment of Canada
 The Royal Hamilton Light Infantry
 The Essex Scottish Regiment
 Les Fusiliers Mont-Royal
 The Queen's Own Cameron Highlanders of Canada
 The South Saskatchewan Regiment
 14th Canadian Armoured Regiment (The Calgary Regiment)

British regiments

 Parachute Regiment
 Army Commandos (1942–1944)

References

See also
North-West Europe campaign of 1940
North-West Europe Campaign of 1944–1945

Battle honours of the British Army
Battle honours of the Canadian Army